George Anson Starkweather (November 7, 1821 – August 11, 1904) was an American lawyer, merchant, schoolteacher and public official on the local level in Pennsylvania.  He served as auditor of Wayne County, township clerk for Canaan, director of one of the examining boards for teachers, overseer of the poor, justice of the peace and assessor.

A native of the Wayne County borough of Waymart, he built a leather tannery there in 1859, but the structure was subsequently destroyed in a fire.

George Anson Starkweather died at the age of 82.

References

External links
George Anson Starkweather. findagrave.com

Pennsylvania lawyers
Businesspeople from Pennsylvania
School board members in Pennsylvania
People from Wayne County, Pennsylvania
1821 births
1904 deaths
Place of death missing
19th-century American businesspeople